Bill Madden (born 1946) is an American sportswriter formerly with the New York Daily News. A member of the Baseball Writers' Association of America, he has served on the Historical Overview Committee of the Baseball Hall of Fame in 2005, 2007 and 2008, helping to select candidates for the final ballots presented to the Veterans Committee.

Madden grew up in Oradell, New Jersey, and graduated from Bergen Catholic High School.

Madden was a sportswriter with United Press International for nine years before he joined the Daily News in 1978. He covered the New York Yankees before becoming a columnist in 1989. In 1990, he crossed picket lines while the Daily News writers were on strike. He has written the books Damned Yankees: A No-Holds-Barred Account of Life With "Boss" Steinbrenner (1991, with Moss Klein), Zim - A Baseball Life (2001, with Don Zimmer), Pride of October: What it Was to Be Young and a Yankee (2003), and Bill Madden: My 25 Years Covering Baseball's Heroes, Scoundrels, Triumphs and Tragedies 2004 Steinbrenner: The Last Lion of Baseball (2010), "1954 - The Year Willie Mays and the First Generation of Black Superstars Changed Baseball Forever" (2014), and "Lou - -Fifty Years of Kicking Dirt, Playing Hard and Winning in the Sweet Spot of Baseball" (with Lou Piniella) (2017).

In 2010, Madden was the recipient of the baseball scribe's highest honor, the J.G. Taylor Spink Award. Madden and other Spink award winners are recognized at the Hall of Fame in Cooperstown with a display in the "Scribes and Mikemen" exhibit behind the Gallery of Plaques.

On September 16, 2015, Madden was laid off from the Daily News by publisher Mort Zuckerman in a cost-cutting effort that included other longtime, well-known columnists. However, two years later, Madden was brought back on a freelance basis and continues to write several columns a week.

In 2016 and 2017, Madden interviewed Tom Seaver in Seaver's winery for a documentary to be aired in 2019, when Seaver was already battling the effects of lyme disease which mimicked the memory loss symptoms of dementia or Alzheimer's disease. When Seaver died in 2020, Madden wrote Tom Seaver: A Terrific Life in honor of him.

References

External links
Baseball Hall of Fame
Madden's Daily Columns

1946 births
Living people
Bergen Catholic High School alumni
BBWAA Career Excellence Award recipients
Journalists from New York City
Sportswriters from New York (state)
People from Oradell, New Jersey